Thomas Broberg is a senior engineer for Volvo in Gothenburg, Sweden, who is active in automobile safety. He also worked for Ford Motor Company.

He was featured in ITV's Police Camera Action! on the episode "Highway of Tomorrow" in 2000.

References

External links 
Picture of Thomas Broberg

Swedish engineers
Living people
Year of birth missing (living people)